Stockmann plc is a Finnish retailer established in 1862.

Stockmann's eight company-owned department stores are in Finland (six), Estonia (one), and Latvia (one). There also was an additional nine Stockmann-branded department stores in Russia owned and operated by Reviva Holdings, with a license to use the Stockmann name until 2023.

It is the largest department store in the Nordic countries.

Lindex, owned by Stockmann, has 475 stores in 16 countries, including 39 franchised stores.

Stockmann has been a member of the International Association of Department Stores from 1950 to 2020, with various CEOs acting as presidents of the Association over time.

History

Stockmann was established by Georg Franz Stockmann, a merchant from Lübeck, Germany who took a job as a bookkeeper at a Nuutajärvi Glassworks store in Helsinki Senate Square. In 1859, Stockmann became the manager of the store. In 1862, Stockmann took control of the store and the Stockmann department store was officially established. In 1902, the company was renamed G.F. Stockmann Aktiebolag. The shareholders were Stockmann and his two sons, Karl and Frans. Stockmann died in 1906. In 1930, the Stockmann, Helsinki centre store was finished, complete with revolving doors, a soda fountain, and escalators. Also in 1930, Stockmann bought a neighbouring book store, Akateeminen kirjakauppa (the Academic Bookstore). The first television transmission in Finland was broadcast from the department store in 1950.

In the 1950s, Stockmann opened a department store in Tampere. Stockmann opened department stores in Tapiola in 1981 and Turku in 1982. In 1986, the first  sales were held. The sales proved extremely popular and became a biannual event. The first Stockmann stores outside of Finland opened in Moscow in 1989, and in Tallinn in 1993. The northernmost department store, in Oulu, opened in 2001 and closed in 2017.

In 1989, Stockmann began operations in Russia, with the opening of a small stand in the GUM department store in Moscow.

In December 2007, Stockmann acquired Lindex, a Swedish clothing retailer with 331 outlets in the Nordic region and the Baltic states.

Stockmann sold Seppälä on 1 April 2015 to Seppälä's CEO Eveliina Melentjeff and her husband Timo Melentjeff.

In September 2015, Stockmann sold The Academic Bookstore to Bonnier Books AB media.

In February 2016, Stockmann sold its operations in Russia to Reviva Holdings. Stockmann continued to own and operate Nevsky Centre in Saint Petersburg until it was sold in January 2019.

On January 1, 2017, Stockmann sold Hobby Hall to SGN Group.

In 2017, the company sold its food division, Stockmann Herkku, to S Group for €27 million.

In May 2018, the company sold Kirjatalo, the building opposite their flagship store in Helsinki which houses the Academic Bookstore, for €108 million.

In March 2019, CEO Lauri Veijalainen resigned.

In June 2019, the company announced 150 layoffs.

Locations

Finland
 Helsinki City Center, Stockmann's oldest and largest flagship store
 Itis shopping centre, Helsinki
 Jumbo shopping centre, Vantaa
 Ainoa shopping centre, Espoo
 Tampere
 Turku, in Hansa shopping centre

Estonia and Latvia
 Tallinn, Estonia
 Riga, Latvia

Russia (under license)
 Saint Petersburg, Russia
 Moscow, Russia
 Kazan, Russia
 Yekaterinburg, Russia
 Krasnodar, Russia

In January 2022, Sberbank and Yakov Panchenko, actual owner of Stockmann in Russia, announced the binding agreement for the purchase of 100% stake of Stockmann by the bank by June 2022. Presently, 100% of shares of Stockmann in Russia are hypothecated by "Sberbank".

References

External links

Stockmann Share

Companies based in Helsinki
Companies listed on Nasdaq Helsinki
Retail companies established in 1862
Department stores of Finland
1862 establishments in Finland
Finnish brands